Lozice may refer to places:

Czech Republic
Lozice (Chrudim District), a municipality and village in the Pardubice Region

Poland
Łozice, Podlaskie Voivodeship (northeastern Poland)
Łozice, Koszalin County in West Pomeranian Voivodeship (northwestern Poland)
Łozice, Pyrzyce County in West Pomeranian Voivodeship (northwestern Poland)

Slovenia
Lozice, Vipava, a village in the Municipality of Vipava, southwestern Slovenia

See also 
 Lozica (disambiguation)